Mohammed Houari Bassim (born January 26, 1977) is a Moroccan basketball player. He currently plays for MAS in the Moroccan Basketball League.

Career
Houari is a member of the Morocco national basketball team and competed for the team at the 2005, 2007 and 2009 FIBA Africa Championship. In the most recent tournament, he saw six games of action off the bench for the 12th place Moroccans.

References

1977 births
Living people
Moroccan men's basketball players
Small forwards
Power forwards (basketball)